Mathur Vaishya (Mathuria Vaishya) are a caste community of the Vaishya varna of Hinduism.

See also
 Mathur (subcaste)

References

www.mvsamaj.com
Social groups of Uttar Pradesh
Social groups of Rajasthan
Bania communities
People from Mathura